Bioley may refer to:

Bioley-Magnoux, Vaud, Switzerland
Bioley-Orjulaz, Vaud, Switzerland